Demićka is a river that flows through Bosnia. It is the largest left bank tributary of the Vrbanja river.

It rises above the Dunići village at around 1,050 meters above sea level, on the southern slopes of Zāstinje (Backstones, 1,230 m), in Vlašić massif. The river's length is around 10 km.

Demićka streams northwest through Dèmići village between the Radohova and Stražbenica Mountains. The river mouth is in Šiprage. Downstream of its source, Demićka enters a short canyon below Dunići village, known as Dunića stijene (Dunići's Rocks), followed by a funnel-shaped area near its estuary. Below Dunići, the river enters a vertical ravine with a depth of 400 meters.

In spring Vrbanja's tributaries  (Ćorkovac, Sadika, Duboka  and Ugar's confluence of  Kobilja and other streams) flow. The main tributaries of Demićka are Grozničavica, Djevojački potok and Brestovača.

References 

Rivers of Bosnia and Herzegovina